Cryomorphaceae is a family of bacteria in the order Flavobacteriales which occur in marine habitats.

References

Further reading
 
 

Flavobacteria